Chulukua , also known as Chulukua-Ryu, is a Native American fighting art which was accredited by the International Society of Black Belts in 1970. It is claimed to be the first American martial art which was so accredited.

It was used by Geronimo and the tribe of Chiricahua Apaches. It was developed as a martial art by Native American elder, Harley "SwiftDeer" Reagan. In 1994, Reagan received the Golden Life Achievement Award from the World Martial Arts Hall of Fame.

References 

Martial arts in the United States